The Menarini Group is an Italian pharmaceutical company. Its headquarters is in Florence, Tuscany, and it has three divisions: Menarini Ricerche, Menarini Biotech, and Menarini Diagnostics. It develops pharmacological solutions for cardiovascular diseases, oncology, pain/inflammation, asthma and anti-infectives. Menarini's research activities are carried out through Menarini Ricerche, which deals with all R&D activities, from the creation of new projects up to the drug registration. Its Menarini Biotech follows the creation of a biotechnological drug from the very early stages of research, through to the pilot scale and up to industrial production. The Group's Menarini Diagnostics division is a health care company with a worldwide network of affiliates partners and distributors focused on diabetes, haematology, clinical chemistry, urinalysis, and immunology. In 2020, the company had 17,650 employees worldwide.

Massimiliana Landini Aleotti and her three children inherited the company, valued at US$11.6 billion, following the death of her husband in May 2014.

Menarini developed a rapid COVID-19 test amid the COVID-19 pandemic in Italy, capable of giving a result in just 20 minutes.

Social causes

Pediatricians network against child abuse 
"Paediatric network against ill-treatment of minors" has been launched and supported by the pharmaceutical company, Menarini, together with :it:Telefono Azzurro, the Italian Federation of Paediatricians, and the Association of Italian Paediatric Hospitals, has grown beyond Italian borders.

The project originated in Italy and is the first of its kind in the world. It was launched in May 2016 in the city of Florence and is supported  by Menarini with an investment of one million Euro. It foresees the creation of a network of 15,000 paediatricians and general practitioners deployed over the entire Italian territory who act as 'sentinels' in the fight against child abuse. These physicians, who have been 'trained' on the skills needed to recognise the unexpressed 'sentinel' warning signs of child abuse,  shall in turn become reference people for their colleagues on a local level, providing qualified information and advice. This project for the creation of an anti-abuse network.

On 18 October 2016 the project was presented in Tirana to more than 500 paediatricians, not only from the Balkans but also from other countries such as Romania, Switzerland, Turkey and others.

Social housing renovation project 
The Menarini pharmaceutical group is committed to the recovery of several social housing owned by the municipality of Florence. So far the apartments recovered are 20 and have been assigned to families of small and medium size. The surfaces of the delivered housing ranging from 50 to 70 square meters each. The first agreement between the Menarini Group and the City of Florence was presented on 16 July 2013 by the mayor of Florence, Matteo Renzi and Lucia Aleotti, President of the Menarini pharmaceutical group.

On 18 January 2014 the Menarini Group has delivered the first three of 10 apartments, located in Via Rocca Tedalda, in the south side of Florence.

On 27 March 2014, were delivered the keys of the last 7 houses of the first edition of the project.

On 12 December 2014 it was announced the second edition of the project of social housing redevelopment in Palazzo Vecchio by Mayor Dario Nardella, the President and the vice-chairman of the pharmaceutical group Menarini Lucia and Alberto Giovanni Aleotti.

On 21 April 2015, 10 apartments renovated from Menarini were delivered to 10 needy families in the city.

On 30 November 2015 it was announced the third edition of the project.

On 17 June 2016 the Menarini Group and the City of Florence have handed over the keys of 10 renovated houses to those families included in the social rankings of the city.

In March 2018, the company announced the new board of directors of the company which for the first time sees an external manager, Eric Cornut, fill the role of president. Cornut, a Swiss from Basel with a master's degree in California, a life in Novartis and for two years, until April 2017, in charge of the general management of Epfia, the European Federation of Pharmaceutical Industries. On 12 September 2019, the Board of Directors appointed Elcin Barker Ergun as the company's CEO.

See also
Dexketoprofen
Ibodutant
Berlin Chemie

Publications

References

External links

Pharmaceutical companies of Italy
Companies based in Florence
Pharmaceutical companies established in 1886
1886 establishments in Italy
Italian brands
Multinational companies headquartered in Italy